Parasuvaikkal is a village in Thiruvananthapuram district in the state of Kerala, India.

Parasuvaikkal has four Hindu temples, Parasuvaikkal major Sree Bhagavathy temple governed by Travancore Devaswom Board, Ponnamkulam Devi Kshethram, Idanatukonam Sree Dharma Sastha Temple and Kottakkakam Sree Mahadeva Kshethram Trust. A mosque and number of churches are there. Educational institutions are very few in number.

Transport 
Connected from major cities. NH 66 Road passing through Parasuvaikal via to Kanniyakumari.

Parasuvaikkal is the next village after Parassala from Kerala - Tamil Nadu Border and its well connected to a number of major cities in Kerala by road and rail.

A small railway station in the Southern Railway network is nearby, namely Dhanuvachapuram. Most of the passenger trains stops here.

The Salem - Kanyakumari National Highway (NH 66) passes through the village. Government buses  as well as private bus services operate between Thiruvananthapuram and other major towns such as Parassala, Neyyattinkara, Balaramapuram, Kollam and the northern districts of Kerala.

Thiruvananthapuram International Airport, Cochin International Airport, Tuticorin Airport, Madurai Airport are the nearest airports.

Demographics
 India census, Parasuvaikkal had a population of 17092 with 8477 males and 8615 females.

References

Villages in Thiruvananthapuram district